This is a list of Canadian Senate appointments during a prime minister's tenure. Members of the Senate of Canada are appointed by the Governor General of Canada on the recommendation of his or her prime minister. This list is broken-down by party, and further sorted into three categories: senators appointed who sat in the government caucus, senators appointed who sat in opposition caucuses, and senators appointed who sat in neither.

Only Prime Ministers Sir John A. Macdonald, John Thompson, Pierre Trudeau, and Paul Martin recommended with any frequency the appointment of senators belonging to opposition parties; all together, only six opposition senators have been appointed on the recommendation of other prime ministers. Of those six, only four have been from the party forming the Official Opposition. Of those four, three were appointed on the recommendation of Prime Minister Robert Borden, who was trying to create a cross-party coalition National Government during World War I. The other appointment was made on the recommendation of Louis St. Laurent, upon the advice of his strategists, as the PC Party was in danger of losing official party status in the Senate by dropping below five seats. No other prime minister advised the appointment of opposition senators, and one, Kim Campbell, recommended none.

Notes

References

 Parliament of Canada: Appointments to the Senate by Prime Minister

Prime minister